Jack Brattan (1931 – 25 August 2010) was a Gaelic footballer. He played as a full-back at club level with Armagh Harps, at inter-county level with Armagh and at inter-provincial level with Ulster.

Honours
Armagh Harps
Armagh Senior Football Championship (4): 1952, 1955, 1957, 1958

Armagh
Ulster Senior Football Championship (2): 1950, 1953
Dr Lagan Cup (3): 1954, 1955, 1956
All-Ireland Minor Football Championship (1): 1949
Ulster Minor Football Championship (1): 1949

Ulster
Railway Cup (1): 1956

References

1931 births
2010 deaths
Armagh Harps Gaelic footballers
Armagh inter-county Gaelic footballers
Ulster inter-provincial Gaelic footballers